Sontirat Sontijirawong (born 19 March 1960) is a former Thai politician. He served as Minister of Energy in the second cabinet of Prime Minister Prayut Chan-o-cha. Supattanapong Punmeechaow was appointed as his successor. On 19 January 2022, Sontirat formed a new party alongside Uttama Savanayana called Sang Anakot Thai (Building Thailand's Future).

Early life and education 
Sontirat born on 19 March 1960 in Kanchanaburi. He holds a bachelor's degree in Material science and a Master of Business Administration from Chulalongkorn University.

Careers 
Sontirat was a businessman. He was a former member of the National Reform Council, later he was appointed as an advisor to the Minister of Industry in September 2015 by the advice of Deputy Prime Minister Somkid Jatusripitak and then was appointed as Deputy Minister of Commerce in December 2016 and Minister of Commerce in November 2017. After he joined Palang Pracharath Party in the 2019 Thai general election, he was appointed by Prayut Chan-o-cha to the position of Minister of Energy until July 2020.

Royal decorations 
 2015 -  Companion (Fourth Class) of The Most Admirable Order of the Direkgunabhorn
 2017 -  Knight Grand Cross (First Class) Order of the Crown of Thailand
 2020 -  Knight Commander (Second Class) Order of the White Elephant

References 

Living people
1960 births
Sontirat Sontijirawong
Sontirat Sontijirawong
Sontirat Sontijirawong
Sontirat Sontijirawong
Sontirat Sontijirawong
Sontirat Sontijirawong
Sontirat Sontijirawong